Kosmos 112 ( meaning Cosmos 112) or Zenit-2 No.37 was a Soviet, first generation, low resolution, optical film-return reconnaissance satellite launched in 1966. It was the first satellite to be launched from the Plesetsk Cosmodrome.

Kosmos 112 was launched by a Vostok-2 rocket, serial number U15001-09, flying from Site 41/1 at Plesetsk. The launch took place at 10:28 GMT on 17 March 1966, and following its successful arrival in orbit the spacecraft received its Kosmos designation; along with the International Designator 1966-021A and the Satellite Catalog Number 02107.

After eight days in orbit, Kosmos 112 was deorbited, with its return capsule descending under parachute and landing at 05:31 GMT on 25 March 1966 et recovered by Soviet force.

References

Kosmos satellites
Spacecraft launched in 1966
Spacecraft which reentered in 1966
Zenit-2 satellites
1966 in the Soviet Union